GreatMixes is a remix album released by Supergroove in 1994 to capitalise on the band's success generated by their hit album Traction and the large following they had attracted worldwide from their live performances.

Whilst only a stopgap release, it was remixed by the New Zealand hip hop artist DLT.  Following Great Mixes, DLT released a very successful album, The Tru School, containing a New Zealand number 1 single, "Chains", featuring Che Fu, who was returning the favour for the work done on Great Mixes (this single is seen as one of the catalysts that led to Fu leaving the band before the recording of Backspacer).

Track listing 
Platinum Blondes
Bloody Shame
Screwdriver
Hoopla
Depth Bomb
Platinum Blonde (Instrumental)
Screwdriver (Instrumental)

References
Amplifier article on Supergroove

Supergroove albums
1994 remix albums
RCA Records remix albums